Yulia Vyacheslavovna Lipnitskaya (also spelled Julia Lipnitskaia; , ; born 5 June 1998) is a Russian retired competitive figure skater. She was part of the Russian team to win the 2014 Winter Olympics team trophy. Individually, Lipnitskaya is the 2014 World silver medalist, the 2014 European champion, the 2013–14 Grand Prix Final silver medalist, and a two-time Russian national silver medalist (2012 & 2014). Competing as a junior, Lipnitskaya won the 2012 World Junior Championships, 2011–12 JGP Final, and 2012 Russian Junior Championships. She retired from the professional sport on 9 September 2017 due to complications with ligaments of the legs and hip joints, as well as anorexia.

Lipnitskaya is the youngest Russian athlete to win a gold medal at the Winter Olympics. Within the ladies' singles category, she is the youngest gold medalist at the European Championships. She is also the youngest woman figure skater to win a gold medal at the Olympics under modern rules. Lipnitskaya was 15 years, 249 days old when Russia won the team trophy.

Early life
Yulia Lipnitskaya was born on 5 June 1998 in Yekaterinburg, Russia. Lipnitskaya was raised by a single mother, Daniela Leonidovna Lipnitskaya, who gave her own surname to Yulia. Lipnitskaya's father, Vyacheslav, was drafted into the Russian army while her mother was pregnant, and he chose not to return to the family afterwards. Lipnitskaya's grandmother, Evgenia Koklova, engaged in acrobatics, skating, and sailing in her youth.

Career

Early career
Lipnitskaya began training at age four, when her mother convinced the experienced skating coach Elena Levkovets to accept her as a student. She skated in Yekaterinburg until 2009, when she and her mother began to discuss her future, concluding that they should either relocate for the purposes of her skating career or leave the sport. They moved to Moscow where Lipnitskaya joined Eteri Tutberidze's group in March 2009.

In the 2009–10 season, Lipnitskaya placed fifth on the junior level at the 2010 Russian Championships. She was fourth on the senior level the following season at the 2011 Russian Championships. She also competed at the 2011 Russian Junior Championships but withdrew from the competition after the short program.

2011–12 season
Lipnitskaya became age-eligible for junior international competition in the 2011–12 season. She debuted on the Junior Grand Prix series at the JGP Baltic Cup in Gdańsk, Poland, winning both programs to take the gold medal. She then won her second assignment in Milan, Italy, to qualify for the JGP Final. At the JGP Final in Quebec, Lipnitskaya placed first in both segments to win the gold medal.

Lipnitskaya won silver on the senior level at the 2012 Russian Championships, having placed third in the short program and first in the free skate, and later took gold at the 2012 Russian Junior Championships. At the 2012 World Junior Championships, she won gold while achieving the junior-level ladies' record for the combined total (187.05 points) and the free skate (broken in 2014 by Elena Radionova). After the event, she said: "I liked everything and the performance was ideal. Now I am in a great mood. It was a great ending for a great season". She had no falls on the ice when competing during the 2011–12 season.

2012–13 season: Senior debut
Lipnitskaya became age-eligible for some senior events but not the World or European Championships. She made her senior debut at the 2012 Finlandia Trophy where she won the gold medal. Lipnitskaya was assigned to two Grand Prix events. She had some boot problems early in the season. Having placed first in the short program and second in the free skate, Lipnitskaya won the silver medal at the 2012 Cup of China behind gold medalist Mao Asada. She said she was more nervous than usual. The day before she left for Paris for the 2012 Trophee Eric Bompard, Lipnitskaya twisted her right ankle during off-ice training and could hardly do any jumps a day before the start of the event, but decided to compete in the short program as she felt better. She placed first in the short program and third in the free skate and won the bronze medal behind teammate Elizaveta Tuktamysheva.

Lipnitskaya qualified for the Grand Prix Final in Sochi, Russia, but withdrew due to injury — during training on 28 November, she lost balance on the entry to a spin, split her chin and sustained a slight concussion. Doctors recommended that she stay off the ice for at least two weeks. She resumed partial training in mid-December, omitting jumps and spins, and then after eight days began full training. Needing more preparation time, Lipnitskaya withdrew from the senior Russian Championships. She returned to competition at the 2013 Russian Junior Championships and finished in 5th place. After the competition, Lipnitskaya said she was still working to return to form after her injury and puberty issues. She then competed at the 2013 World Junior Championships where she won the silver medal with teammates Elena Radionova and Anna Pogorilaya taking the gold and bronze medals respectively.

2013–14 season
Lipnitskaya selected all the music for her programs by herself. For the 2013–14 season, she chose Mark Minkov's You Don't Give Up On Love (Russian: Не отрекаются, любя) for her short program, because she loves the song. She chose the theme from Schindler's List for her free skate after she had watched the film many times. Initially, her coach was not convinced that it was a good idea and they struggled to find a choreographer for the program. Former ice dancer Ilia Averbukh choreographed her programs. Coach Eteri Tutberidze said: "She had repeatedly watched this movie – and she said she wanted to be the girl in the red coat".

In the 2013–14 season, Lipnitskaya became age-eligible for all senior ISU events. She began her season by winning the gold medal at the 2013 Finlandia Trophy. Her first 2013–14 Grand Prix event was the 2013 Skate Canada International. She placed second in the short program and first in the free skate, winning gold with 198.23 points in total. She won another gold medal at the 2013 Rostelecom Cup with a new personal best SP score of 72.24 points. The results qualified her to the Grand Prix Final. At the event in Fukuoka, Japan, she placed fourth in the short program, second in the free skate, and won the silver medal behind Mao Asada. She is Russia's youngest medalist at the Final since Irina Slutskaya.

Lipnitskaya won the silver medal behind Adelina Sotnikova at the 2014 Russian Championships, after placing second in the short and first in the free. In her European Championships debut, she placed second to Sotnikova in the short program, first in the free skate, and scored a total of 209.72 points (the first Russian to score above the 200 mark in ladies' singles). Finishing ahead of Sotnikova and Carolina Kostner, 15-year-old Lipnitskaya became the youngest European champion in ladies' singles and the first Russian to win the ladies' title since Slutskaya eight years earlier, in 2006.

Lipnitskaya was selected for the 2014 Winter Olympics in Sochi. The first skating event was the team trophy, which allowed each team to make a maximum of two substitutions. The Russian team initially discussed assigning Lipnitskaya to the free skate and Sotnikova to the short program but ultimately it was decided that Lipnitskaya would skate both. She placed first in both segments to help team Russia win the gold medal. She became the youngest Olympic gold medalist under modern rules, being six days younger than American Tara Lipinski was when she won the 1998 Winter Olympics at 15 in Nagano, Japan. The only skater younger than Lipnitskaya to have won gold is Maxi Herber who won Olympic pair skating gold at the 1936 Winter Olympics, however Herber would have been too young to skate at the Olympics under modern rules, so her record is impossible to beat. On 10 February 2014, Lipnitskaya appeared on the cover of Time magazine in the European and Asian editions. After the team event, she left Sochi to train at her regular rink in Moscow. Tutberidze said that the Russian media interest was excessive—listening devices were found in the locker room in Moscow and reporters followed both the skater and her relatives. In the individual event, she placed fifth in the short program after falling on her triple-flip, sixth in the free skate after a step out on her triple-loop and a fall on her triple-salchow, and finished 5th overall. Lipnitskaya stated, "I fought and fought but couldn't take it to the end, I had enough physical strength left, but at the end I lost control of my jumps. Nervousness, fatigue – everything came into play and hit me over the head."

At the end of March, Lipnitskaya made her Worlds debut at the 2014 World Championships in Saitama, Japan. She placed third in the short with a new personal best score of 74.54 points after executing a clean short program. She landed a triple Lutz-triple toe loop combination, a triple flip and a double Axel and earned level fours on all her spins and her steps sequence. She placed second in the free skate earning 132.96 points, and won the silver medal at her first Senior World Championships appearance at the age of 15 years. Her total score of 207.50 points placed her 9.19 points behind gold medalist Mao Asada and 3.67 ahead of bronze medalist Carolina Kostner.

2014–15 season
For the 2014–15 season, Lipnitskaya was selected to compete at 2014 Cup of China and 2014 Trophée Éric Bompard. At the Cup of China, Lipnitskaya was first after the short program. However, she was fourth in her free skate, putting her in second overall behind Elizaveta Tuktamysheva. Lipnitskaya missed the medal ceremony after having left the rink to go to her hotel due to the stress of having a poor freeskate and having been unaware of the time of the ceremony. She had received a call from the event organizers, informing her of the ceremony and hurried back to the rink, but it had been too late to attend the ceremony. The ISU fined her by deducting part of her prize money. Lipnitskaya won the silver medal at the Trophée Bompard behind compatriot Elena Radionova after placing second in both segments. Her results qualified her for the Grand Prix Final in Barcelona. At the final, she placed second in the short program behind Tuktamysheva. However, she struggled during the free skate, causing her to drop to fifth overall. At the 2015 Russian Championships, she placed sixth in the short program and eleventh in the free skate, which resulted in ninth place overall. She was not selected to compete at the 2015 European Championships, preventing her from defending her title, nor at the 2015 World Championships. On 13 January 2015, after a meeting with FFKKR officials, Lipnitskaya stated that this season was over for her and that she would recover and train for the next season. She also told that she intended to stay with her then-coaches.

2015–16 season
In May 2015 Lipnitskaya started working with new choreographer Marina Zueva in Chicago to prepare her programs for new season. Her 2015–16 Grand Prix assignments were the Skate America and the Trophée Éric Bompard.

She began her season with a 2nd-place finish at 2015 Finlandia Trophy.

She placed fifth at 2015 Skate America during the short program but dropped to seventh after struggles in the free skate, resulting in an overall 6th place.

Before the Trophée Éric Bompard, she changed her dress for the short program. After the short program, she was in 2nd place, but the competition was cancelled due to the terrorist attacks in Paris, which occurred only hours after the first day of competition concluded. On 18 November 2015, it was announced that she left her longtime coaches, Eteri Tutberidze and Sergei Dudakov to move to train under 1994 Olympic Champion, Alexei Urmanov, in Sochi.

On 24–27 December, Lipnitskaya competed at the 2016 Russian Championships, where she finished in 7th place behind Adelina Sotnikova. Following her placement at the nationals, she was named 2nd alternate for the 2016 European Figure Skating Championships.
Lipnitskaya competed at the 2016 Russian Cup Final, where she placed 1st in the short program, and 2nd in the freeskate, resulting in a silver medal finish behind compatriot Alena Leonova. On 8 March, Russian Federation named Lipnitskaya as 1st alternate for the 2016 World Figure Skating Championships anyway. Lipnitskaya competed between 11–13 March at 2016 Cup of Tyrol in Insbruck, Austria, in which she won the gold medal, her first win at a competition in two years.

2016–17 season
For the 2016–17 season, Lipnitskaya was assigned to two ISU Grand Prix events, Skate America and Rostelecom Cup.
She began her season by placing second at the Ondrej Nepela Memorial, to teammate Maria Sotskova. Lipnitskaya withdrew from Skate America after a recurring injury. She opted to compete at her second Grand Prix assignment, the 2016 Rostelecom Cup. In the short program, Lipnitskaya earned 69.25 points, the highest score she's received since the 2014 Cup of China, and she went into third place behind compatriots Elena Radionova and Anna Pogorilaya who placed second and first respectively. In the free skate, her leg injury aggravated her, causing her to stop just after the halfway point in the program. After negotiating with the judges and her coach, she was allowed to continue where she left off, but was heavily penalized for the interruption. She then suffered one fall, and earned 79.21 points, making for a total score of 148.46, thereby finishing in 12th and last place.

Following training on 18 December 2016, Lipnitskaya slipped on a patch of ice, injuring her right hip and lower back. As a result, she withdrew from the Russian Championships. As the placements at Russian Nationals determine Grand Prix assignments for the succeeding season, she was not able to participate in the 2017/2018 ISU Grand Prix series.

Retirement
On 28 August 2017, Lipnitskaya's mother, Daniela, told TASS that her daughter had decided to retire in April, and had informed the Russian Figure Skating Federation of her decision following a return home from continental Europe, where she underwent three months of medical treatment. Valentin Piseyev, Honorary President of the Russian Figure Skating Federation, confirmed that Lipnitskaya had informed them of her decision in April and that August's announcement did not come as a surprise.

Lipnitskaya has suffered from anorexia, for which she had been treated for three months in an Israeli clinic.

Russian coach Tatiana Tarasova commented, "Yulia is a star. Some stars shine for a long time, while others will shine too bright and burn out. She lit up everything. I want to wish her a wonderful life, which she deserves, for she is a very good, very smart girl and very kind."

Despite being retired from competitive figure skating, she is still involved in the sport and takes masterclasses for young skaters. She has also performed leading roles in ice ballet shows such as Cinderella and The Nutcracker in 2019.

In December 2020, Lipnitskaya joined the coaching staff of Evgeni Plushenko's skating academy.

Personal life
Lipnitskaya is in a relationship with Russian skater Vladislav Tarasenko. In June 2020, Lipnitskaya confirmed that they were expecting their first child together. Their daughter Katalina was born on 27 June 2020.

In 2022, her husband Vladislav Tarasenko, with Lipnitskaya's blessing, volunteered to participate in the Russian invasion of Ukraine. As of 2023, he is deployed in the Russian-occupied Zaporozhye Oblast.

Endorsements
Lipnitskaya appeared on the front cover of the May 2014 issue of Elle Girl Russia. She won the Nickelodeon Kids Choice Award for favorite Russian athlete in 2015, and signed a long-term contract with Adidas in the same year.

Records and achievements
Youngest Olympic figure skating gold medalist under modern rules.
Youngest ladies' singles skater to win an Olympic gold medal (skating in the team trophy).
Youngest ladies' singles skater to win the European title.
First Russian ladies' singles skater to win an Olympic gold medal (skating in the team trophy).
First Russian ladies' singles skater to score above the 200 mark in total score.
Former world record holder for the junior ladies' free skate score (123.96), set at the 2012 World Junior Figure Skating Championships on 3 March 2012. Record was broken two years later on 16 March 2014 by Elena Radionova (Russia).
Former world record holder for the junior ladies' total score (187.05), set at the 2012 World Junior Figure Skating Championships on 3 March 2012. Record was broken two years later on 16 March 2014 by Elena Radionova (Russia).

List of Lipnitskaya's junior world record scores

Programs

Competitive highlights

GP: Grand Prix; CS: Challenger Series; JGP: Junior Grand Prix

Detailed results
Small medals for short and free programs awarded only at ISU Championships. At team events, medals awarded for team results only.

Senior career

Junior career

Awards
 Russian Order of Friendship for "great contribution to the development of physical culture and sports, high sports achievements at the 2014 XXII Winter Olympic Games in the city of Sochi" (24 February 2014)

Notes

References

External links

 

! colspan="3" style="border-top: 5px solid #78FF78;" |Historical World Junior Record Holders (before season 2018–19)

1998 births
Living people
European Figure Skating Championships medalists
Figure skaters at the 2014 Winter Olympics
Sportspeople from Yekaterinburg
Medalists at the 2014 Winter Olympics
Olympic figure skaters of Russia
Olympic gold medalists for Russia
Olympic medalists in figure skating
Season's world number one figure skaters
Russian female single skaters
World Figure Skating Championships medalists
World Junior Figure Skating Championships medalists